"Asphalt Mother" was released as a 45 single in 1968. In 2006, it was included along with its flip side on the Mind Garage Early Years  "Reach Out" CD which was a collection of seven demos recorded by the band in 1968.

Background

The Mind Garage traveled from Morgantown, WV to Bell Sound Studios in New York to record Asphalt Mother and made only 1000 vinyl copies.

Norris Lytton uses an 8 string Hagstrom bass guitar for a sharp, crisp sound. John Vaughan's Gibson Firebird  employs a gutsy fuzz tone, and Jack Bond's Hammond B-3 and Leslie hold the composition together. Syncopation with the other instruments is achieved by Ted Smith's precision drumming. After a fade out and a four-second pause when the song appears to be over, the music comes back in full force for another 30 seconds.

Personnel
Larry McClurg - Lead vocal, lyrics
John Vaughan - Lead guitar
Jack Bond - Keyboard
Ted Smith - Percussion
Norris Lytton - Bass guitar
Glenn Cambell - Sound engineer
Tom Cossie - Assistant producer

Reception
"Asphalt Mother" continues to survive on its own more than four decades after it was recorded, despite never having been promoted. It is played on FM radio, and appears on 60s compilation CDs, pirated discs, internet radio, and BitTorrents.

References

1968 singles
1968 songs